These are the official results of the Women's High Jump event at the 1993 IAAF World Championships in Stuttgart, Germany. There were a total number of 38 participating athletes, with two qualifying groups and the final held on Saturday August 21, 1993. The qualification mark was set at 1.93 metres.

Schedule
All times are Central European Time (UTC+1)

Abbreviations
All results shown are in metres

Results

Qualifying round
Held on Thursday 1993-08-19

Final

See also
 National champions high jump (women)
 1992 Women's Olympic High Jump

References 

 Results
 IAAF

H
High jump at the World Athletics Championships
1993 in women's athletics